Bernard Diamond VC (January 1827 – 24 January 1892) in Portglenone, County Antrim, Ireland was a recipient of the Victoria Cross, the highest and most prestigious award for gallantry in the face of the enemy that can be awarded to British and Commonwealth forces.

Details
He was approximately 30 years old, and a sergeant in the Bengal Horse Artillery, Bengal Army during the Indian Mutiny when the following deed took place on 28 September 1857 at Bolandshahr, India for which he and Gunner Richard Fitzgerald was awarded the Victoria Cross:

Further information
He died in Masterton, New Zealand on 24 January 1892 after emigrating, and was buried at the Archer Street Cemetery.

The medal
His Victoria Cross is displayed at the QEII Army Memorial Museum in Waiouru, New Zealand.

References

Listed in order of publication year 
 The Register of the Victoria Cross (1981, 1988 and 1997)
 
 Ireland's VCs (Dept of Economic Development, 1995)
 Monuments to Courage (David Harvey, 1999)
 Irish Winners of the Victoria Cross (Richard Doherty & David Truesdale, 2000)

External links

 DerryJournal:Bernard Diamond – Portglenone's VC winner
 

1827 births
1892 deaths
19th-century Irish people
Irish recipients of the Victoria Cross
British East India Company Army soldiers
People from Portglenone 
Indian Rebellion of 1857 recipients of the Victoria Cross
Irish emigrants to New Zealand (before 1923)
British military personnel of the Second Anglo-Sikh War
Burials at Archer Street Cemetery
Military personnel from County Antrim